Brad Leigh is an American Audio Engineer, known for having recorded and mixed many recordings including Billy Joel's River of Dreams, Tracy Chapman's  Matters of the Heart as well as Julian Lennon's Valotte and Secret Value of Daydreaming

Biography
Brad Leigh was born and raised in New York City. While attending Brooklyn Technical High School, he worked as an usher during concerts at Carnegie Hall. After graduation in 1975, Leigh attended Al Grundy and John Woram's Institute of Audio Research and was then hired at Chelsea Sound by Mark Freeh as an intern/assistant engineer/tech. In 1977, he left Chelsea Sound and took an MCI Factory training course to learn to repair MCI pro audio equipment, after which he was hired as a tech by Don Frey at A&R Recording. It was during this time that Leigh first met producer/engineer and owner of A&R Recording, Phil Ramone.  The following year, Leigh became the assistant engineer for Jim Boyer who was Phil Ramone's chief engineer.  Leigh assisted Boyer until 1979, when Leigh became Phil Ramone's assistant engineer on Billy Joel's Glass Houses.  While assisting Ramone, Leigh worked on albums for Paul Simon, Chicago, and Frank Sinatra. He continued to engineer for Ramone through the late eighties. Leigh's first full engineering credit was for the score/soundtrack for the film Reds followed by the original cast album for Little Shop of Horrors and while freelancing, he went on to engineer for Jimmy Iovine, Russ Titelman, Billy Joel and Davitt Sigerson. Leigh has recorded and mixed live concerts for HBO and Showtime using The Record Plant, Effanel, Sheffield remote recording trucks, and has recorded film scores for Marvin Hamlisch, David Grusin and Carly Simon.

In the late 1990s, Leigh accepted a position as Chief Technical Engineer at Sound on Sound Recording, NYC, where he continued to engineer recordings such as Widespread Panic's Til the Medicine Takes and Five for Fighting's debut, Message for Albert. In 2005, Sound on Sound merged with Right Track Recording, changing its name to MSR Studios. Leigh was Chief Technical Engineer at MSR until its closing in June 2016.

Technical Design
While at MSR, Leigh designed and manufactured audio equipment including custom dual 18″ subwoofers which were in both Studio A and Studio C and used on countless records as well as high resolution dynamics meters for the Neve VR console,  the Procue personal headphone mixing system and a high quality DVD interface for SACD players.

Selected works

Studio Recordings

Jaymay - Fallin' Like Snow
Widespread Panic - Til the Medicine Takes
Tracy Chapman - Matters of the Heart
Billy Joel  - River of Dreams
Chet Baker  - The Best Thing For You
Bus Stop  - Miracle Time
Cords Taurus -  No Bull
Tanya Blount  - Natural Thing
Malcolm McLaren  - Fans
Billy Joel -  An Innocent Man
Megadeth  - Hangar 18 (EP)
Julio Iglesias -  Crazy
Collision  - Collision
Ten Wings  - Wishing Well
Billy Joel  - Complete Hits Collection 1974-1977
Grupo Miguelito  - Grupo Miguelito
Lazybatsu  - Other View
Best of World Music  - “I’m Not Tired” (M. Fashek)
Majek Fashek  - Spirit of Love
Jude Cole  - Jude Cole
Charles & Eddie  - Duophonic
Julian Lennon  - Valotte
Billy Joel  - Nylon Curtain
The Daou (Vanessa Daou)  - Head Music
Ghost of an American Dream -  Skin
Cords  - Gasping
Carly Simon  - Working Girl Sound Track
Frank Sinatra  - L.A. Is My Lady
Parlor James  - Dreadful Sorry
Five For Fighting  - Message For Albert…
Vernon Reid/Bill T. Jones  - Still Here (Live at BAM)
Madder Rose  - Bring it Down
Peabo Bryson  - Through The Fire
Milla “Gentleman Who Fell” (Single)
Julian Lennon  - The Secret Value of Daydreaming
Billy Joel  - Songs in the Attic
Joe Jackson -  Mike’s Murder
Famous Charisma Box  - Self Titled
John Waite  - Rover’s Return

Live Recordings

Billy Crystal  - Midnight Train to Moscow
Billy Joel  - Koheupt- Live from Leningrad (BBC)
Wynton Marsalis - The Late Show (BBC)Free To Be A Family Live from the Hard Rock NYC
Billy Joel  - A Matter of Trust (ABC)
Tallinn  - Rock Summer ’88 Pil. 
Big Country - Boris Grebenshikov and Dave Stewart
Julian Lennon  - Stand By Me (Showtime)
VH-1 Lifebeat Concert (Milla segment)

Film and Broadway
Jason Robert Brown - Wearing Someone Else's Clothes 
Marvin Hamlisch  - The Goodbye Girl
Carly Simon  - Working Girl
Phil Ramone/Dave Grusin  - Reds
Dave Grusin  - Tootsie
Little Shop of Horrors  - Original Cast Album
Marvin Hamlisch  - Winter Garden
Various artists -  D.C. Cab
Steve Poltz  - "Everything About You" for Notting Hill
Marvin Hamlisch - Men and Women
Drums of Passion -  The Serpent and the Rainbow

References

1957 births
Living people